Elections for the London Borough of Merton were held on 6 May 2010. This was on the same day as other local elections in England and a national general election.

Following the elections, a Labour minority administration was formed with the support of the three Merton Park Ward Residents Association councillors, this replaced the previous Conservative administration.

Results 
Labour became the largest party in Merton, defeating the incumbent minority Conservative administration. However, Labour fell three seats short of a majority, so the council remained under no overall control.

The Liberal Democrats regained two seats in West Barnes from the Conservatives and the Merton Park Ward Residents' Association maintained its three councillors in Merton Park.

|}

UKIP defections 
On 15 May 2013, four Conservative councillors defected to the UK Independence Party (UKIP). This included Suzanne Evans, who later became a national UKIP spokeswoman. No by-elections were called as a result of the defections.

Results by Ward

Abbey

Cannon Hill

Colliers Wood

Cricket Green

Dundonald

Figge’s Marsh

Graveney

Hillside

Lavender Fields

Longthornton

Lower Morden

Merton Park

Pollards Hill

Ravensbury

Raynes Park

St Helier

Trinity

Village

West Barnes

Wimbledon Park

By-Elections

The by-election was called following the resignation of Cllr. Tariq Ahmad.

The by-election was called following the death of Cllr. Gam Gurung.

References

Council elections in the London Borough of Merton
2010 London Borough council elections
May 2010 events in the United Kingdom